Keke Wyatt (born Ke'Tara Shavon Wyatt) is an American R&B recording artist. She has written and recorded material for her four studio albums, Soul Sista (2001), Who Knew? (2010), Unbelievable (2011), Rated Love (2016) and one extended play Ke'Ke' (2014). Songs included in this list are from her studio albums, extended play as well as collaborations with other recording artists on duets and featured songs on their respective albums and the unreleased tracks during the recording process the unreleased albums Emotional Rollercoaster (2005) and Ghetto Rose (2007).

Debut 
At age fifteen, Wyatt recorded "My First Love" with Avant which was released two years later, eventually becoming a single for his album My Thoughts (2000). Wyatt gained much notoriety for the remake of the 1980s ballad by Rene & Angela. Its success, remaining on the Top 10 for several weeks, resulted in a solo album contract with MCA Records. With the help of the late MCA Record executive Louil Silas, her friend and A&R Randy Jackson, whom she met at age twelve, and former Boyz II Men manager Quadri El Amin, Wyatt recorded her first album within two weeks time. Her first single, "Used to Love", became a moderate hit on the Hot R&B/Hip-Hop Singles & Tracks chart her follow-up single "Nothing in This World", her second duet with Avant, charted higher and became her first entry to the Billboard Hot 100 chart. Soul Sista (2001), was released as her debut album it made the Top 40 on the Billboard Hot 200. In 2002, Keke was featured on the 2001 soundtrack for Brown Sugar on a song called "It's Going Down" with Blackalicious the song was also  the song was later featured on Blackalicious's second studio album Blazing Arrow (2002). Keke was also featured on the 2004 soundtrack for Barbershop 2: Back in Business on a song called "Your Precious Love" with Avant.

In 2010, Keke released her sophomore album Who Knew?. The album spawned one single, the title track "Who Knew?" failed to make impact on the Billboard Hot 100, however the single charted in the Top 40 on the Hot R&B/Hip-Hop Songs chart.  In 2011, Keke released her third album, Unbelievable. The album's lead single "Saturday Love," (2011) which features Ruben Studdard failed to make impact on the Billboard Hot 100, however the single charted in the Top 40 on the Hot R&B/Hip-Hop Songs chart.

In 2012, Keke was featured on the song You & I with Avant for his seventh studio album Face the Music (2013). The song was a successful hit for the duo hitting the top spot on the Adult R&B Songs chart. Keke released her first EP, Ke'Ke', was released on May 6, 2014, through Aratek Entertainment. The lead single "Fall in Love" was released (2014) and charted in the Top 20 on the Hot R&B/Hip-Hop Songs chart. The second single "Lie Under You" (2014) failed to make impact on the Billboard Hot 100 and therefore failed to chart in the United States. In 2014, Keke featured on Faith Evans sixth studio album Incomparable on the track "Make Love" which was released as a single on June 9, 2015.

Keke released her fourth studio album, Rated Love, on April 22, 2016, through Aratek Entertainment. The lead single "Sexy Song" was released (2015) and failed to make impact on the Billboard Hot 100, however the single charted in the Top 30 on the Hot R&B/Hip-Hop Songs chart. The second single "Love Me" was released (2016) failed to make impact on the Billboard Hot 100 and therefore failed to chart in the United States. On October 13, 2016, it was announced "Jodeci" would be released as the album's third single on a new deluxe version of her album Rated Love on October 21, 2016.

Released songs

Unreleased songs
Many officially unreleased Keke Wyatt songs have been scheduled, at one point, for release on records by the singer, including her two unreleased studio albums with her former music labels TVT Records and Cash Money Records: Emotional Rollercoaster (2004) and Ghetto Rose (2007). For varying reasons, the tracks were ultimately rejected or shelved. As of 2016, the songs remain either completely unreleased or have been leaked onto the internet and mixtapes without gaining an official release. The singer's unreleased material includes songs recorded by Wyatt as a solo artist. Eleven tracks that were recorded for Emotional Rollercoaster were leaked in 2009.

See also
 Keke Wyatt discography

Notes

References

Wyatt, Keke